

Ulrich Grauert (6 March 1889 – 15 May 1941) was a general in the Luftwaffe of Nazi Germany during World War II who commanded 1st Air Corps. He was killed on 15 May 1941 when his Junkers Ju 52 aircraft was shot down by F/Lt Jerzy Jankiewicz and Sgt Wacław Giermer, both flying a Supermarine Spitfire II, from the No. 303 Polish Fighter Squadron near Saint-Omer on the French channel coast.

Awards

 Knight's Cross of the Iron Cross on 29 May 1940 as General der Flieger and Commanding General of the I. Flieger-Korps

References

Citations

Bibliography

 Gretzyngier, Robert; Matusiak, Wojtek (2001). Poles in defence of Britain: a day-by-day chronology of Polish day and night fighter pilot operations, July 1940 - June 1941. London, UK: Grub Street. .
 

1889 births
1941 deaths
Luftwaffe World War II generals
Recipients of the Knight's Cross of the Iron Cross
Military personnel from Berlin
Aviators killed by being shot down
Luftwaffe personnel killed in World War II
People from the Province of Brandenburg
Colonel generals of the Luftwaffe
20th-century Freikorps personnel